Carsten Nicolai (18 September 1965), also known as Alva Noto, is a German musician and visual artist. He is a member of the music groups Diamond Version with Olaf Bender (Byetone), Signal with Frank Bretschneider and Olaf Bender, Cyclo with Ryoji Ikeda, ANBB with Blixa Bargeld, ALPHABET with Anne-James Chaton, Opto with Thomas Knak, and Alva Noto + Ryuichi Sakamoto with whom he composed the score for the 2015 film The Revenant.

Life and career
Carsten Nicolai was born in Karl-Marx-Stadt (now Chemnitz) of Saxony, GDR in 1965. He studied architecture and landscape design before pursuing art. In 1994 he founded the label NOTON, following which a collaboration with RasterMusic began and by 1999 the two labels had merged into Raster-Noton, which operated until 2017. 
Returning to the labels origin in 2017, Nicolai runs NOTON separately.

In 2009 Nicolai wrote the opera Sparkie: Cage and Beyond in collaboration with Michael Nyman.

Nicolai performed and created installations in many of the world's most prestigious spaces including the Guggenheim, New York, the SF MoMA, Modern Art Oxford, NTT Tokyo, Tate Modern and Venice Biennale, Italy. As a member (and co-founder) of the Raster-Noton label he was responsible for the acclaimed CD series 20 to 2000 that went on to win the Golden Nica prize at Prix Ars Electronica, 2000.

Carsten Nicolai also works as a visual artist. In 2013, Nicolai participated as a visual artist in Biennale Documenta, an official collateral show of the 55th Venice Biennale of Art.

Nicolai started his professorship in art with focus on digital and time-based media with Dresden Academy of Fine Arts since 2015.

Nicolai scored the music for Alejandro González Iñárritu's The Revenant. The score was nominated for a Golden Globe, BAFTA, Grammy and Critics' Choice Movie Awards. In 2018 he created the sound design for Iñárritu’s groundbreaking VR project "Carne y Arena" Flesh and Sand.

Solo exhibitions (selection)
 2019: Parallax Symmetry, Kunstsammlung Nordrhein-Westfalen, Düsseldorf
 2012: unidisplay, Hangar Bicocca, Milan
 2007: static fades, shown at PaceWildenstein, New York City and in Haus Konstruktiv, Zürich
 2006: inver, shown at Frieze Art Fair, London and at Galerie EIGEN + ART, Leipzig
 2006: Polylit, Kunstmuseum Stuttgart
 2005: Audio Visual Spaces, Stedelijk Museum voor Actuele Kunst (S.M.A.K.), Ghent
 2005: Anti Reflex, Schirn Kunsthalle, Frankfurt
 2005: syn chron, shown at Neue Nationalgalerie, Berlin
 2003: funken, Galerie EIGEN + ART, Berlin
 2002: International Art Biennial, Buenos Aires
 2000: Ystads Konstmuseum (Sweden)
 1999: 1% space, Copenhagen
 1998: polyfoto, Galerie für zeitgenössische Kunst, Leipzig

Discography

Alva Noto solo studio albums
 Prototypes — 2000 (Mille Plateaux)
 Transform — 2001 (Mille Plateaux) & re-released on Raster-Noton in 2008 
 Xerrox Vol.1 — 2007 (Raster-Noton)
 Unitxt — 2008 (Raster-Noton)
 Xerrox Vol.2 — 2009 (Raster-Noton)
 Univrs — 2011 (Raster-Noton)
 Xerrox Vol.3 — 2015 (Raster-Noton)
  Unieqav — 2018 (Noton)
 Xerrox Vol.4 — 2020 (Noton)
 HYbr:ID I — 2021 (Noton)

Alva Noto as Aleph-1 solo studio album
 Aleph-1 — 2007 (iDeal)

Alva Noto extended plays (EP)
 Transrapid — 2005 Raster-Noton
 Transvision — 2005 Raster-Noton
 Transspray — 2005 Raster-Noton
 Unieqav Remixes — featuring reworks by Fatima Al Qadiri, Ben Frost, JASSS, Florian Kupfer, Luis Da Silva — 2020 (Noton)

Alva Noto as noto solo studio albums
 spin — 1996 (Noton)
 infinity — 1997 (Noton)
 infinity (endless loop edition) — 1997 (Noton)
 kerne — 1998 (Noton)
 polyfoto — 1998 (Noton)
 time..dot — 1999 (Noton)
 empty garden, inside out '— 1999 (Noton)
 telefunken — 2000 (Noton)
 endless loop (e, f, g, h) — 2002 (Noton)
 autorec — 2002 (Noton)
 sonar endless edition — 2003 (Noton)

Compilation albums
For— 2006 (Line)
For 2— 2010 (Line)

Soundtrack albums
 The Revenant — 2015 Milan Records

Collaborations
With Ryuichi Sakamoto, as alva noto + ryuichi sakamoto
 Vrioon — December 2002 (Raster-Noton)
 Insen — March 2005 (Raster-Noton)
 Revep — March 2006 (Raster-Noton)
 Insen Live — October 2006 (Raster-Noton). DVD release
 utp_ — September 2008 (Raster-Noton)
 Summvs — May 2011 (Raster-Noton)
 Alva Noto, Mika Vainio, Ryoji Ikeda - Live 2002 - 19 January 2018 (Noton)
 "Glass" — February 2018 (Noton)
 Two (Live At Sydney Opera House) — November 2019 (Noton)

With Ryoji Ikeda, as "Cyclo."
 Cyclo. — 2001 (Raster-Noton)
 Cyclo.id — 2011 (Raster-Noton) 
 Cyclo. — 2017 (Noton)
 Cyclo.id — 2017 (Noton)

With Mika Vainio, as "noto"
 Ø + noto - mikro makro - 1997 (Noton)
 Ø + noto - wohltemperiert - 2001 (Noton)

With Scanner (Robin Rimbaud)
 Uniform: SF MoMA 2001. CD Contains 1 track, "Uniform," performed and recorded by Carsten Nicolai and Robin Rimbaud (Scanner) for the exhibition of ""010101: Art in Technological Times"" at the San Francisco Museum of Modern Art (SFMOMA) on 3 March 2001.

With Blixa Bargeld, as ANBB
 Ret Marut Handshake — 2010 (Raster-Noton)
 Mimikry — 2010 (Raster-Noton)

With Opiate (Thomas Knak), as Opto
 Opto Files — 2001 (Raster-Noton).  Limited CD release. Number 6 in the raster.static series. CD Comes in a silver anti-static bag with green card insert.
 Opto: 2nd — June 2004 (Hobby Industries). The CD contains ten tracks, all titled with times of the day. The collaboration was created in a 48-hour period and was inspired by the restored recording from a cassette found in a forest in Eastern Germany.

With Zeitkratzer
 Zeitkratzer & Carsten Nicolai: Electronics — 2008 (Zeitkratzer Records)

With Anne-James Chaton and Andy Moor
 Anne-James Chaton With Alva Noto And Andy Moor - Décade (CD, Album, Ltd, Boo), Raster-Noton, R-N 135, 2012

With Anne-James Chaton as Alphabet
 Alva Noto & Anne-James Chaton - ALPHABET (CD, Digital Album), Noton, 2019

With Olaf Bender (Byetone), as Diamond Version
 EP1 — 2012 (Mute)
 EP2 — 2012 (Mute)
 EP3 — 2013 (Mute)
 EP4 — 2013 (Mute)
 EP5 — 2013 (Mute)
 CI — 2 / 3 June 2014 (Mute)

With Iggy Pop and Tarwater
 Leaves of Grass — February 2016 (Morr Music). A seven-track EP on which Iggy Pop performs the poetry of Walt Whitman to music composed by Alva Noto and Tarwater.

Compilation appearances (exclusive/non-albums tracks)
 "Monophaser 4" from "V.a. – :2" (2008)
 "Garment" from "Sound Canvas | 1" (2008)
 "Planet Rock" from "Recovery" (2008)
 "Stalker" from "In Memoriam Andrey Tarkovsky" (2008)
 "Haloid Xerrox Copy 3 (Paris)" from "Mind The Gap Volume 70" (2007)
 "06.1 Quanta Random" from "Tribute to Iannis Xenakis" (2007)
 "Sonolumi (For Camera Lucida)" from "Camera Lucida" (2007)
 "Odradek (Music to Play in the Dark)" from "It Just Is In Memoriam Jhonn Balance" (2005)
 "Re10" from "Landscape 2" (2005)
 "Post-Remo" from "Richard Chartier + Various – Re'Post'Postfabricated" (2005)
 "Party Plasibenpuis (for Rune Lindblad)" from "The Hidden City: Sound Portraits from Goteborg" (2004)
 "Time...Dot (3)" from "An Anthology of Noise & Electronic Music Third A-Chronology 1952-2004" (2004)
 "m6re" from "SoundxVision 2004" (2004)
 "Obi 2 Min." from "Frecuencies [Hz]" (2003)
 "60 sec" from "Soundcultures" (2003)
 "Strategies Against War 1.0—Covering All Information with White Noise" from "60 Sound Artists Protest the War" (2003) as Carsten Nicolai
 "MM", "Time Dot" from "Raster-Noton. Archiv 1" (2003) as Noto
 "Obi_2.3" from "Electrograph 02 – Athens Sound Media Festival 02" (2002)
 "Menschmaschine" from "Klangmaschine_Soundmachine" (2002)
 "Crystal R" from "Various – Live Sets At Ego 1998-2000" (2002) as Noto
 "M 06 Short" from "Electric Ladyland Clickhop Version 1.0" (2001)
 "Neue Stadt (Skizze 8)" from "Clicks & Cuts, Vol. 2" (2001)
 "Modul 4", "Impulse" from "Raster-Noton.(O)acis Box" (2001) as Noto
 "Neue Stadt Skizze 1" from "Between Two Points" (2001) as Noto
 "Sound Mobile" from "Ringtones" (2001)
 "Prototyp P" from "Raster-Noton. Oacis" (2000)
 "Prototype n." from "Clicks & Cuts" (2000)
 "Crystal s 10 60 sec." from "Computer Music Journal Sound Anthology, vol. 24" (2000) as Noto
 "Crystal.s2" from "Microscopic Sound" (1999) as Noto
 "∞ [Radio Teeth Edit]" from "Various – Because Tomorrow Comes #2" (1999) as Carsten Nicolai
 "Polyfoto 1a-1" from "Modulation & Transformation 4" (1999) as Noto
 "Zeit T3" from "Effe 1999" (1999)
 "POL .Motor", ".Test", ".Versuch", ".Anordnung", ".Variation", ".Modell" from "Just About Now" (1998) as Carsten Nicolai
 "Chemnitz" from "Decay" (1997) as Noto

Remixes
 Björk – Innocence (Alva Noto Unitxt Remodel 12" Remix)
 Björk – Dark Matter (Alva Noto Remodel)
 Byetone – Plastic Star (Alva Noto Remix)
 Greie Gut Fraktion – Wir Bauen Eine Neue Stadt (Alva Noto Remodel)
 Hauschka – Radar (Alva Noto Remodel)
 John Cale – Catastrofuk (Alva Noto Remodel)
 Kangding Ray – Pruitt Igoe (Rise) (Alva Noto Remodel)
 Ludovico Einaudi – Divenire (Alva Noto Remodel)
 Machinefabriek – Stofstuk (Alva Noto Remix)
 Modwheelmood –  Things Will Change (Remodeled by Alva Noto)
 Opiate – 100301 (Re-Model by Alva Noto)
 Pantha Du Prince – Frau Im Mond, Sterne Laufen (Alva Noto Remodel)
 Pomassl – Sol (Alva Noto Rmx)
 Ryuichi Sakamoto – Insensatez (Re-model by Alva Noto)
 Ryuichi Sakamoto – Undercooled (Alva Noto Remodel)
 Sōtaisei Riron + Keiichirō Shibuya – Our Music (Remodel Light)
 Spyweirdos – Wiesbaden (Already Happened Tomorrow) (Schwarzer Bock Mix)

Installations, etc.
 Audio installation in the Piazza del Plebiscito, Naples, Italy, December, 2009
 Opening performance for "010101: Art in Technological Times" at the San Francisco Museum of Modern Art (SFMOMA) on 3 March 2001
 Lovebytes Digital Festival, Sheffield, England, 2003
 Sónar Music Festival, 2004 and 2009
 Netmage, Bologna, Italy, 2006
 BBmix Festival, 31 October 2008
 Club Transmediale, Berlin, Germany, 2009, 2008 and 2000
 Pace Gallery, New York, 2010

Accolades
Source:

 2003: Scholarship of Villa Aurora, Los Angeles
 2007: Zurich Art Prize
 2007: Scholarship of Villa Massimo, Rome
 2012: Giga-Hertz Prize for Electronic Music of the ZKM Center for Art and Media Karlsruhe (together with Ryoji Ikeda)
 2015: Grand Prize of the Japan Media Arts Festival, Tokyo

See also 
List of ambient music artists
List of intelligent dance music artists
List of sound artists

References

External links
 Alva Noto website
 Carsten Nicolai website
 NOTON website
 Raster-Noton website
 

German electronic musicians
German sound artists
Living people
1965 births
German contemporary artists
20th-century German musicians
20th-century German male musicians
20th-century German artists
20th-century German male artists
21st-century German musicians
21st-century German male musicians
21st-century German artists
21st-century German male artists
People from Chemnitz
Artists from Saxony
Musicians from Saxony